Thomas Gregory Everett (born November 21, 1964) is a former American football safety in the National Football League (NFL) for the Pittsburgh Steelers, Dallas Cowboys and Tampa Bay Buccaneers. He played college football at Baylor University, where he won the Jim Thorpe Award as the top defensive back in college football. He won two Super Bowl rings with the Cowboys, both over the Buffalo Bills.

Early years
Everett was born in Daingerfield, Texas. He attended Daingerfield High School, where he started playing football as a sophomore. Although his best position was running back, he played seven positions including quarterback. 

As a senior, he received All-district honors in football and basketball. He later became the first, and so far only person to have his number retired at Daingerfield High School.

College career
Everett accepted a football scholarship from Baylor University, where he played under College Football Hall of Fame coach Grant Teaff. As a freshman, he began the year at running back and was named the starter at cornerback halfway through the season. 

As a sophomore, he began the season at corner, but was moved to free safety in the second game, where he blossomed and collected 99 tackles.

As a junior, he became one of the best defensive backs in the nation, eventually being named a two-time All-American selection, a two-time Southwest Conference Defensive Player of the year and twice first team All-Conference. As a senior, he registered 86 tackles (7 for loss), 14 passes defensed and 6 interceptions.

As a senior in 1986, Everett became the first-ever winner of the Jim Thorpe Award as the nation's top defensive back. He was also voted the conference's Athlete of the Year.

Everett was a leader during one of the school's most successful eras as the Bears won 30 games and appeared in three bowl games. He left as the fourth all-time tackler (325) in school history. He also ranked among Baylor's top 10 in interceptions (12), punt returns (80) and punt return yards (766).

In 2006, he was elected to the College Football Hall of Fame. He was named to Baylor's All-Decade team of the 1980s and to the Baylor Athletics Hall of Fame. In 2015, he was inducted into the Southwest Conference Hall of Fame.

Professional career

Pittsburgh Steelers
Everett was selected by the Pittsburgh Steelers in the fourth round (94th overall) of the 1987 NFL Draft, after dropping because he was considered too small to play safety. As a rookie, he quickly established himself as a punishing hitter and was named the starter at free safety in the eighth game of the season against the Miami Dolphins. He had 7 tackles, one interception and one forced fumble against the Kansas City Chiefs. He made 2 interceptions against the Cincinnati Bengals. He had 13 tackles against the San Diego Chargers. He finished with 72 tackles (second on the team), 3 interceptions, 8 passes defensed and one forced fumble.

In 1988, he had 6 tackles, one interception and one fumble recovery in the season opener against the Dallas Cowboys. He missed 2 contests with a calf and ankle injury he suffered in the second game against the Washington Redskins. He made 8 tackles and one interception in the fifth game against the Cleveland Browns. He had 8 tackles against the Phoenix Cardinals. He tallied 60 tackles, 3 interceptions, 9 passes defensed and 2 fumble recoveries.

In 1989, he started in all 16 games. He posted 81 tackles, 3 interceptions, 9 passes defensed and one fumble recovery.

In 1990, he suffered a lacerated forehead in the season opener against the Browns and did not start in the next 2 contests. He returned to the starting lineup in the fourth game against the Dolphins. He totaled 35 tackles, 3 interceptions, 5 passes defensed and 2 forced fumbles.

In 1991, he started all 16 games. He had 8 tackles in the tenth game against the Bengals. He made 2 interceptions and one forced fumble in the twelfth game against the Houston Oilers. He tallied 57 tackles, 4 interceptions (led the team), 12 passes defensed, 2 fumble recoveries and one forced fumble.

On September 19, 1992, after having missed the first two games due to a contract dispute, he was traded to the Cowboys in exchange for a fifth round draft choice (#140-Marc Woodard).

Dallas Cowboys
In 1992, he was named the starter at strong safety. In his first season with the Cowboys he wore number 31, because reserve running back Curvin Richards had the number 27, which was the one he wore for five seasons with the Steelers. When Richards was cut after the final regular season game, he changed his number to 27 for the playoffs. His first start came in the sixth game against the Kansas City Chiefs and made 8 tackles. He had 11 tackles in the eighth game against the Philadelphia Eagles. He had 2 interceptions in the ninth game against the Detroit Lions. He suffered a strained right shoulder in the eleventh game against the Detroit Lions and missed the next 2 contests. The Cowboys went on to win Super Bowl XXVII, with Everett recording 6 tackles, two interceptions, one fumble recovery and one sack in the 52-17 victory over the Buffalo Bills. He finished with 58 tackles (seventh on the team), 2 interceptions, 2 fumble recoveries and 6 passes defensed.

In 1993, he was moved to his natural free safety position, so that Darren Woodson could start at strong safety. He posted 97 tackles (third on the team), 2 interceptions, one quarterback pressure, 10 passes defensed and 10 special teams tackles, while contributing to the Cowboys winning back-to-back Super Bowls.

On April 2, 1994, because of salary cap reasons he was traded to the Tampa Bay Buccaneers in exchange for a fourth round draft choice (#109-Willie Jackson). He was replaced with James Washington. Everett was one of the most important acquisitions made during the Jimmy Johnson era, helping to solidify the team's defense along with Charles Haley.

Tampa Bay Buccaneers
In 1994, he started 15 games at free safety, making 65 tackles, one interception, 4 passes defensed, one fumble recovery and one special teams tackle. In 1995, he was limited to 13 games (10 starts) because of a knee injury, registering 60 tackles, 4 passes defensed, one fumble recovery and one sack. He was waived on March 20, 1996.

Personal life
His brother Eric Everett played for the Philadelphia Eagles (1988–89), Tampa Bay Buccaneers (1990), Kansas City Chiefs (1991), and Minnesota Vikings (1992). He currently runs an athletic camp called Thomas Everett Athletics.

References

External links
 Little Big Man

1964 births
Living people
All-American college football players
American football safeties
Baylor Bears football players
College Football Hall of Fame inductees
Dallas Cowboys players
National Conference Pro Bowl players
People from Daingerfield, Texas
Pittsburgh Steelers players
Players of American football from Texas
Tampa Bay Buccaneers players